Hendrik Tavenier (1734 in Haarlem – 1807 in Haarlem), was an 18th-century painter from the Northern Netherlands.

Biography
According to the RKD he became a member of the Haarlem Guild of St. Luke in 1759. He was a pupil of Jan Augustini in his wallpaper factory, and later made a living in landscape drawings and prints. He is also known for topographical drawings of North Holland, and the North Holland archives have a large selection of drawings and watercolours by his hand.

References

Hendrik Tavenier on Artnet
Tavenier in the North Holland Archives

External links

1734 births
1807 deaths
18th-century Dutch painters
18th-century Dutch male artists
Dutch male painters
Artists from Haarlem
Painters from Haarlem